The HelpMe Feed Foundation is an Australian non-profit organization that supports breastfeeding. The foundation created the HelpMe Feed app, which aims to facilitate and expand on the support offered by health professionals to parents.

History 
The HelpMe Feed Foundation was formed by team members from Small World Social who shared a vision to use new technology to support young families around the world learn to breastfeed and care for new infants. With a dedicated team of volunteers, the members of Small World Social shared the goal of managing the creation and distribution of the HelpMe Feed app globally. 

When the group came together in 2014 when Maddy Sands of Small World Social saw an opportunity to use new technology to support women learning to breastfeeding. Originally, the project began as the Google Glass breastfeeding app trial. This trial was supported by the Australian Breastfeeding Association.

Karina Ayers, RN IBCLC joined the HelpMe Feed Foundation in 2015. From there, the foundation turned its focus towards building the HelpMe Feed app: a subscription-based tool that scales the support offered by health professionals to breastfeeding mothers. It includes a library of breastfeeding support videos and resources.

Aims 
The HelpMe Feed Foundation aims:
 To reach health professionals and help them support more breastfeeding mothers
 For parents to become more knowledgeable, skilled, and confident about breastfeeding
 To decrease social stigma and raise public awareness around breastfeeding

Awards and recognition 
In April 2019, HelpMe Feed was awarded a Platinum Hermes Creative Award. In May 2019, HelpMe Feed won an award of distinction in the Communicator Awards - Mobile Apps category.

References

External links 

Foundations based in Australia
Organizations established in the 2010s